A scholaster, from the Latin scholasticus (schoolmaster), or magister scholarum, was the head of an ecclesiastical school, typically a cathedral school, monastic school, or the school of a collegiate church, in medieval and early-modern Europe. Depending on the size of the school and the status of the institution to which it was attached, the scholaster might be the only teacher, the head of a considerable educational establishment, or have oversight over all the schools in their city or territory. The scholaster might be a dignitary in a cathedral or collegiate chapter, alongside the provost, dean, cantor, succentor, precentor, archdeacon, treasurer, cellarer, sacristan or almoner. It was not unknown for a scholaster to take the revenues of the post and deputise somebody else to carry out any teaching work involved.

References

Catholic ecclesiastical titles
Christian religious occupations
Christian terminology
Educational personnel
Medieval European education